The Beckering Family Carillon Tower is a  carillon-clock tower located in Grand Rapids, Michigan, United States on the Pew Campus of Grand Valley State University. The tower and carillon was funded and built by Pioneer Construction in 2000.  The Beckering family, for which the tower is named, established Pioneer Construction in 1933.

The 48 carillon bells are cast of bronze by the Fonderie Paccard in France, who also installed them within the tower.

GVSU also has another carillon, the Cook Carillon Tower, located on the main Allendale campus in Allendale, Michigan.

See also
 List of carillons in the United States

References

External links 
Beckering Family Carillon Tower GVSU webpage

Towers completed in 2000
Grand Valley State University
Bell towers in the United States
Carillons
Clock towers in Michigan
Towers in Michigan
Buildings and structures in Grand Rapids, Michigan
Tourist attractions in Grand Rapids, Michigan